Why Did You Kill Me? is a 2021 American documentary film directed and produced by Fredrick Munk. The film follows Belinda Lane as she tracks down those involved in the murder of Crystal Theobald, her daughter, using MySpace.

It was released on April 14, 2021, by Netflix.

Synopsis
Belinda Lane tracks down those involved in the murder of Crystal Theobald, her daughter, using MySpace.

Release
The film was released on April 14, 2021, by Netflix.

Reception
Why Did You Kill Me? holds a 70% approval rating on review aggregator website Rotten Tomatoes, based on 10 reviews, with a weighted average of 6.90/10.

References

External links
 
 

2021 films
2021 documentary films
American documentary films
Documentary films about gangs in the United States
Documentary films about death
Netflix original documentary films
2020s American films